May Craig may refer to:
 May Craig (actress) (1889–1972), Irish actress in Girl with Green Eyes
 May Craig (island), a small island off the coast of Aberdeenshire, Scotland
 May Craig (journalist) (1889–1975), American journalist

Craig, May